The West North Central states form one of the nine geographic subdivisions within the United States that are officially recognized by the U.S. Census Bureau.

Seven states compose the division: Iowa, Kansas, Minnesota, Missouri, Nebraska, North Dakota and South Dakota and it makes up the western half of the United States Census Bureau's larger region of the Midwest, the eastern half of which consists of the East North Central states of Illinois, Indiana, Michigan, Ohio and Wisconsin. The Mississippi River marks the bulk of the boundary between these two divisions.

The West North Central states are regarded as constituting the core of the nation's "Farm Belt."  Another name popularly applied to the division is the "Agricultural Heartland," or simply the "Heartland."

Since the early 1990s, the West North Central division has consistently had the lowest unemployment rate in the United States (especially in its many college towns), and has also been noted for its plentiful supply of affordable housing.

Demographics 
As of 2020, the West North Central states had a combined population of 21,616,921. This number is a 5.4% increase from 20,505,437 in 2010.

Politics

Bold denotes election winner.

See also
Great Plains

Notes
McCain and Trump won the overall state, but Barack Obama won Nebraska's 2nd congressional district in the 2008 election, while Joe Biden won it in the 2020 election.

References

Midwestern United States
Census regions of the United States
Regions of the United States